A highway patrol, or state patrol is either a police unit created primarily for the purpose of overseeing and enforcing traffic safety compliance on roads and highways, or a detail within an existing local or regional police agency that is primarily concerned with such duties. They are also referred to in many countries as traffic police, although in other countries this term is more commonly used to refer to foot officers on point duty who control traffic at junctions.

Functions

Duties of highway patrols or traffic police may include the following:

 Accident investigation Gathering evidence to determine the cause of a roadway accident.
 Commercial vehicle enforcement Enforcing highway laws related to commercial transport, including weight limits and hazardous materials rules.
 Education Providing public information, handouts, and displays to encourage safe driving and usage of the roads.
 Emergency response Securing the scene of a traffic accident by using cones and flares as well as providing first aid to the injured.
 Law enforcement Assisting local police in rural areas, and keeping an eye out for non-traffic violations.
 Maintenance Observing and reporting damage to the roadways, and conducting hasty road surveys after disasters or the passage of inclement weather.
 Traffic enforcement Enforcing laws and regulations intended to improve traffic safety, such as speed limits.

Argentina
In Argentina, traffic policing is the responsibility of the Argentine National Gendarmerie.

Australia

In Australia, traffic policing is the responsibility of the state police forces (with the notable exception of the Australian Capital Territory, under the responsibility of the Australian Federal Police). Each force has its own traffic sections, often a local section in each area and a statewide section.

Austria
In Austria, traffic policing on highways is the responsibility of the Austrian Federal Police.

Belgium

In Belgium, traffic policing on highways is the responsibility of the Wegpolitie - Police de la Route (WPR) a section of the Federal Police (former Gendarmerie).
 Wiki page about the WPR (in Dutch)

Brazil

In Brazil, traffic policing is the responsibility of state and federal police forces accordingly to the highway administration status. State administered highways (usually shorter, within state borders, two-way, single lane, lower traffic) are policed by a branch of the Military Police forces, called State Highway Military Police. At the same time Federal highways and roads (longer, crossing state borders, some double lane and high-traffic) are the responsibility of the Federal Highway Police.

Canada
In Canada, traffic policing on highways is the sole responsibility of the Royal Canadian Mounted Police, except for the provinces of Ontario, Quebec, Alberta, Saskatchewan and New Brunswick.

Ontario Provincial Police
Sûreté du Québec
Alberta Sheriff Highway Patrol
Saskatchewan Highway Patrol
New Brunswick Department of Public Safety

In Newfoundland and Labrador, the provincial police of the Royal Newfoundland Constabulary serves major metropolitan areas, and highway policing is the responsibility of the Royal Canadian Mounted Police.
In British Columbia, provincial RCMP Traffic Services rebranded themselves as British Columbia Highway Patrol. Their vehicles have their own liveries without the RCMP logo but unlike other Highway Patrol agencies they are not a separate agency instead still part of the RCMP. 
New Brunswick Department of Public Safety officers assist Provincial RCMP with traffic enforcement as RCMP  dismantled all of its traffic units except for one in the province. 
At 2018 Saskatchewan gave additional authorities to their commercial vehicle enforcement agency under provincial response team in relation to criminal code and traffic enforcement and rebranded them as Saskatchewan Highway Patrol to reflect their new powers. Quebec operates the Contrôle routier Québec, who enforce traffic laws in relation heavy vehicles. Northwest Territories have their own Highway Patrol agency called Northwest Territories Highway Patrol for commercial vehicle enforcement.

Colombia
In Colombia, traffic policing on highways is the responsibility of the Colombian National Police, under the responsibility of the Highway Police corps.

Croatia
In Croatia, traffic police special department is the national motorway patrol, patrols the motorways in Croatia. Missions include the prevention and detection of driving offences.

Czech Republic
In the Czech Republic, traffic policing on highways is the responsibility of the Policie CR.

Denmark
In Denmark, traffic policing on highways is the responsibility of the Danish National Police.

Finland
In Finland, traffic policing on highways is the responsibility of the Finnish National Police.

France
In France, traffic policing on highways is the responsibility of dedicated units of the Gendarmerie Nationale, the Escadron départementaux de sécurité routière (EDSR) and the CRS autoroutières of the National Police (France).

Germany

In Germany, traffic policing on highways is the responsibility of the Autobahnpolizei section of the Landespolizei.

Hungary
In, Hungary, traffic policing on highways is the responsibility of the Hungarian National Police (Rendőrség).

India
In India, some states have formed Highway Patrol Wings under their respective state police departments. such as Karnataka Highway Patrol, Kerala Highway Police, Tamil Nadu Highway Patrol, Maharashtra Highway Police, etc. In states where there is no highway police system, traffic policing duties on highways are performed by the traffic police of the respective state police forces.

Indonesia

In Indonesia, traffic policing is the responsibility of the Indonesian National Police's Traffic Corps. The Indonesian National Police Traffic Corps (Korps Lalu Lintas Kepolisian Negara Republik Indonesia abbreviated "Korlantas Polri") oversees several units which regard to traffic policing including the highway patrol unit. It conducts activities such as traffic: law enforcement, management, control, accident handling and prevention, education, escort, and patrol in the roads of the country. The issuing of a driver's license is also conducted by this unit.

Ireland

The Garda Traffic Corps, a specialised unit of the Garda Síochána (the national police force for the Republic of Ireland) is responsible for patrolling the countries motorways and other national routes. They patrol using motorbikes, off-road/4X4s, and a mixture of marked and unmarked high-powered saloon cars.

Italy
In Italy, traffic policing on highways is the responsibility of the Polizia Stradale section of the civilian Polizia di Stato and the Gendarmerie force of the Carabinieri.

Japan

Liechtenstein
Despite the non-existence of motorways due to the country's small size, the Liechtensteiner National Police, the country's small national police force, is in charge of traffic matters.

Luxembourg

In Luxembourg, traffic policing on highways is the responsibility of the Grand Ducal Police, the country's national police force, under the responsibility of the Road Police Unit (UPR - Unité de la police de la route / Eenheet vun der Verkéierspolice / Verkehrspolizeieinheit). This task was previously enforced by the defunct Luxembourgish National Grand Ducal Gendarmerie.

Malaysia 

In Malaysia, traffic policing on highways is the responsibility by Royal Malaysia Police. JPJ also charged with the responsibility of undertaking registration and licensing of drivers and all motor vehicles and trailers in Malaysia.

Mexico
In Mexico, traffic policing on highways is the responsibility of the Mexican National Guard.

Monaco
Despite the non-existence of motorways due to the country's small size, the Monegasque Public Security, the country's small national police force, is in charge of traffic matters.

Morocco
In Morocco, traffic policing on highways is the responsibility of Royal Moroccan Gendarmerie, the country's national gendarmerie force.

Netherlands
In the Netherlands, policing on the highways falls under the purview of the Dienst Infrastructuur, which is one of the Landelijke Eenheid (national police services, as opposed to the regional forces). Their primary focus is to conduct traffic stops with the aim to detect criminal activities and to intercept weapons, money and drugs. Which can be used for criminal activities.

New Zealand
In New Zealand the Highway Patrol operates almost exclusively on state highways and is a division of New Zealand Police. Formerly traffic law enforcement was the responsibility of the Traffic Safety Service of the Ministry of Transport. The MOT had no law enforcement authority beyond traffic. The MOT merged with the Police in 1992 and the Highway Patrol was re-established as its own unit in 2001.

Norway
In Norway, traffic policing on highways is the responsibility of National Mobile Police Service of the Norwegian Police Service.

Pakistan
In Pakistan, traffic policing on National Highways And Motorways is the responsibility of National Highways & Motorway Police.

Philippines
In the Philippines, traffic policing on national highways and motorways is the responsibility of the Highway Patrol Group of the Philippine National Police. The Highway Patrol Group are responsible for intelligence, promulgating anti-carnapping campaigns and other road enforcements. In regards to traffic violations, the Land Transportation Office Law Enforcement Service are responsible for enforcing traffic rules and regulations both for public utility and private vehicles on national highways.

Furthermore, the Metro Manila Development Authority are responsible for policing traffic rules around Metro Manila highways, particularly on Epifanio de los Santos Avenue.

Poland
In Poland, traffic policing on highways is the responsibility of the Policja, the National Police Force.

Portugal
In Portugal, traffic policing on highways is the responsibility of the Republican National Guard.

Russia
In Russia, traffic policing on highways is the responsibility of GIBDD section of the Politsiya and the Public Security Service of the MVD.

Spain

In Spain, traffic policing on highways is the responsibility of the Civil Guard (the country’s Gendarmery force), except in the autonomous communities with transferred competences on traffic policing (Catalonia and the Basque Country), where autonomous police forces (Mossos d'Esquadra and Ertzaintza, respectively) are responsibly for this area. As of 2020, traffic policing in Navarra has been fully transferred to the local autonomous police force, the Policía Foral de Navarra.

Sri Lanka
In Sri Lanka, traffic policing is the responsibility of the Traffic Police, a specialised unit of the Sri Lankan National Police.

Sweden

In Sweden, traffic policing is the responsibility of the Swedish Police Authority. All Swedish police officers have the authority to stop drivers but it is only the police officers within the Swedish Traffic Police division who have the authority to clamp vehicles etc.

Taiwan
In Taiwan, traffic policing on highways is the responsibility of the National Police Agency.

Tunisia
In Tunisia, traffic policing on highways is the responsibility of Tunisian National Guard, the country's national gendarmerie force.

Turkey
In Turkey, traffic policing and highway traffic policing are an extra unit at General Directorate of Security. Traffic Police officers in Turkey, controls seat belts, plates, driving licences and alcohols etc. Highway Traffic Police in Turkey works in Highways like the other countries. In Turkey, every police car has a tablet and a GPS device.

United Kingdom
In the United Kingdom, traffic policing on highways is the responsibility of the Roads Policing Unit of the territorial police force. In some cases, police forces combine their roads policing units, for example the Central Motorway Police Group and North West Motorway Police Group.

United States

Many state police agencies in the United States take the name of "highway patrol" rather than "state police". State police agencies may fulfil the role of highway patrol, and vice versa. For instance, the Arizona Highway Patrol is actually a state police agency, meaning that it is a police body having statewide authority to conduct law enforcement activities and criminal investigations. In addition to its highway patrol duties, it performs functions outside the normal purview of the city police or the county sheriff, such as enforcing traffic laws on state highways and interstate expressways, overseeing the security of the state capitol complex and other state buildings, protecting the governor, providing technological and scientific support services, and helping to coordinate multi-jurisdictional task force activity in serious or complex cases. The California Highway Patrol serves as bailiffs and courtroom deputies for certain state courts, such as the appellate courts and the California Supreme Court building in San Francisco. The state traffic enforcement agency retained the name "California Highway Patrol" after the merger of the smaller California State Police with the larger and better-known CHP and the combination of their functions into one agency. On Long Island, New York, along with neighboring New York City, an unusual arrangement exists in which the city and county highway patrols conduct everyday enforcement on the limited-use highways, with the New York State Police acting in a support role on the limited-access highways within NYC, especially when NYPD Highway Patrol officers call for assistance or are unavailable due to limited manning and deployment elsewhere in NYC.

Some highway patrol organizations, such as the Florida Highway Patrol and North Carolina State Highway Patrol, are specifically charged with the enforcement of traffic laws, and while able to enforce other laws, they are not an official "state police" agency, yet retain their statewide jurisdiction in the same vein as the California Highway Patrol or the New Jersey State Police.  States like Texas have a bona fide and appropriately named state police department such as the Texas Department of Public Safety, of which only one arm is a highway patrol division. In addition, the police departments of Boston, New York City, Philadelphia, Nassau and Suffolk counties in New York have highway patrol bureaus. These units have special uniforms for their highway duty- service caps with the wire grommet removed, giving the classic "crusher" look, leather jackets, riding breeches, riding boots, Sam Browne-style belts and lanyards for their service pistols.  A privately compiled list of Highway Patrol organizations and similar state police agencies is available on the web.  The Iowa State Patrol maintains a list of phone numbers and cell phone dialing codes for non-emergency calls to the dispatchers of the Highway Patrol organizations in all 50 states.  These numbers are useful for motorists who want to report aggressive driving, driving under the influence, or other dangerous but not life-threatening situations that do not require a 9-1-1 call.

Highway patrol and state police officers are often referred to as a "state trooper".  Historically, a troop was a small cavalry unit. Many state police forces originated as mounted paramilitary forces who were stationed in barracks like soldiers, hence the term "trooper." Some agencies, particularly on the East Coast, refer to their state police offices as "barracks", although troopers generally do not reside there. Other state police forces, particularly highway patrols as in California, have always modeled themselves after police officers who simply commute to work like ordinary civilians. Like police officers, they use the title "officer."  Other states use the term "Patrolmen" in reference to members of the State Police or Highway Patrol.

Many states and their Departments of Transportation have organized government-run freeway service patrols, Highway Assistance Patrols, or Highway Safety Patrols, to assist with highway emergencies as needed. While not law enforcement personnel, these persons provide free service to motorists in distress, and secure lanes of traffic, provide emergency medical assistance, request tow trucks for vehicles in inconvenient or dangerous locations, remove debris from the roadway after a crash, and resolve minor disabled vehicle problems, such as flat tires, jumpstarts, or pushing a disabled vehicle out of travel lanes. Many of these patrols work directly with the State Police and Highway Operations departments of their state, and respond to assistance when a citizen calls 911 for minor roadside assistance duties.

See also
 Traffic police
 Traffic warden
 State police
 Police
 Chief of police
 Constable

References

Highways
Law enforcement units
State agencies of the United States
Transportation government agencies of the United States
Law enforcement

fr:Histoire de la police#Polices autoroutières